The Music Building is a music rehearsal facility at 584 Eighth Avenue in Midtown Manhattan, New York City, United States. It is the largest music rehearsal facility in Manhattan with 69 studios on 12 floors that are leased to musicians. It is located near Times Square and allows 24/7 access for musicians. Notable musicians such as Madonna, Interpol, Billy Idol, and Joey Ramone have been tenants at The Music Building. Numerous recordings have taken place at the Music Building by some of the notable tenants.

History

The Music Building was founded in 1979. There were initially two locations in Queens and Manhattan with Queens having more rap and heavy metal bands and Manhattan having more punk, rock, and pop bands. The Music Building in Manhattan became the focal point for all musicians when the Queens building was destroyed by fire in 1996.

The building is currently filled with graffiti art from various artists who have been tenants or have visited other musicians who were tenants in the building. Musicians have stated that instead of living there, The Music Building is like an apartment building where you can rent a room and play 24/7. In addition to renting space to known musicians, The Music Building rents space to local bands and musicians who are just starting.

Artists

The Music Building has been the home to many famous recording artists. In 1979 Chandra Oppenheim started her recording career here. One of the most famous was Madonna who was a tenant from 1980 to 1984. The Strokes are also former tenants of The Music Building and spent most of 1999 writing and rehearsing material there before making their live debut at the Spiral in 1999 and releasing their first album in 2001. The Music Building was also the home to Dubway Studios until 1992.

Other notable tenants include:

 Nervus Rex
 The Del-Lords
 The Fleshtones
 The dB's with Peter Holsapple and Chris Stamey
 Interpol
 Billy Idol
Ambulance
 Jeremy & the Harlequins
 Joey Ramone
 The Patti Smith Group with Patti Smith and Lenny Kaye
 Spread Eagle
 Television
 New York Dolls
 The Toys
 They Might Be Giants

Recordings at The Music Building

References

External links

Recording studios in Manhattan
Eighth Avenue (Manhattan)
Midtown Manhattan